Freckles Playboy (1973–2003, AQHA #0911588) was a sorrel Quarter Horse stallion sired by Jewel’s Leo Bars by Sugar Bars out of Gay Jay by Rey Jay. He was bred by Marion Flynt, and trained and shown in cutting horse competition by Terry Riddle. Freckles Playboy was the 1976 NCHA Futurity Co-Reserve Champion, placed 3rd in the 1977 NCHA Derby, and won the title of 1977 AQHA World Champion Junior Cutting Horse. In 1979, he developed navicular syndrome ending his career as a cutting horse. 

Flynt gifted the stallion and some twenty head of horses to his ranch manager, Kay Floyd, who promoted Freckles Playboy as a cutting horse sire. He was a leading sire and maternal grandsire sire of champion cutting and performance Quarter Horses with offspring that have earned $24.56 million in NCHA competition. In 2003, Freckles Playboy developed kidney failure and was euthanized. He is buried on Floyd's ranch in Stephenville, TX. In 2013, he was inducted into the American Quarter Horse Hall of Fame.

Pedigree 

Source:

References

American Quarter Horse sires
Cutting horses